Ho Ka Po, (born October 27, 1994 in Hong Kong) is a professional squash player who represents Hong Kong. She reached a career-high world ranking of World No. 110 in November 2010.

References

External links 

Hong Kong female squash players
Living people
1994 births
Hong Kong people